Nicholas King Nolte (born February 8, 1941) is an American actor. He won the Golden Globe Award for Best Actor – Motion Picture Drama and was nominated for the Academy Award for Best Actor for the 1991 film The Prince of Tides. He received Academy Award nominations for Affliction (1998) and Warrior (2011), and was nominated for a Primetime Emmy Award for Outstanding Lead Actor in a Limited or Anthology Series or Movie for the 1976 miniseries Rich Man, Poor Man.

His other film appearances include The Deep (1977), Who'll Stop The Rain (1978), North Dallas Forty (1979), 48 Hrs. (1982), Teachers (1984), Down and Out in Beverly Hills (1986), Another 48 Hrs. (1990), Three Fugitives (1989), Everybody Wins (1990), Cape Fear (1991), Lorenzo's Oil (1992), I Love Trouble (1994), Blue Chips (1994), The Thin Red Line (1998), The Good Thief (2002), Hulk (2003), Hotel Rwanda (2004), Over the Hedge (2006), The Spiderwick Chronicles (2008), Tropic Thunder (2008), Cats & Dogs: The Revenge of Kitty Galore (2010), A Walk in the Woods (2015), and Angel Has Fallen (2019).

He was also nominated for a Golden Globe Award for Best Actor – Television Series Musical or Comedy for his role in the TV series Graves.

Early life
Nolte was born in Omaha, Nebraska on February 8, 1941. His father, Franklin Arthur Nolte (1904–1978) was a farmer's son who ran away from home, nearly dropped out of high school and was a three-time letter winner in football at Iowa State University (1929–1931). His mother, Helen (1914–2000), was a department store buyer, then became an expert antique dealer, co-owning a prestigious and successful antique shop. His father was of German ancestry. Nolte's maternal grandfather, Matthew Leander King, invented the hollow-tile silo and was prominent in early aviation. His maternal grandmother ran the student union at Iowa State University. He has an older sister, Nancy, who was an executive for the Red Cross.

Nolte attended Kingsley Elementary School in Waterloo, Iowa. He studied at Westside High School in Omaha, where he was the kicker on the football team. He also attended Benson High School, but was expelled for hiding beer before practice and being caught drinking it during a practice session. Following his high school graduation in 1959, he attended Pasadena City College in Southern California, Arizona State University in Tempe (on a football scholarship), Eastern Arizona College in Thatcher and Phoenix College in Phoenix. At Eastern Arizona, he lettered in football as a tight end and defensive end, in basketball as a forward, and as a catcher on the baseball team. Poor grades eventually ended his studies, at which point his career in theatre began in earnest. While in college, he worked for the Falstaff Brewery in Omaha.

After stints at the Pasadena Playhouse and the Stella Adler Academy in Los Angeles, Nolte spent several years traveling the country and working in regional theater, including the Old Log Theater in Minnesota for three years.

Career

Modeling
Nolte was a model in the late 1960s and early 1970s. In a national magazine advertisement in 1972, he appeared in jeans and an open jean shirt for Clairol's "Summer Blonde" hair lightener sitting on a log next to a blonde Chris O'Connor; and they appeared on the packaging.

Acting

Nolte first starred in the television miniseries Rich Man, Poor Man, based on Irwin Shaw's 1970 best-selling novel. Later, he appeared in over 40 films, playing a wide variety of characters. Diversity of character, trademark athleticism, and gravelly voice are signatures of his career. In 1973, he guest-starred in the Griff episode, "Who Framed Billy the Kid?", as Billy Randolph, a football player accused of murder. Nolte also made two guest appearances in the television series Barnaby Jones in 1974 and 1975. He co-starred with Andy Griffith in Winter Kill, a television film made as the pilot of a possible television series, and another one, Adams of Eagle Lake, but neither was picked up.

Nolte starred in The Deep (1977), Who'll Stop the Rain (1978), North Dallas Forty (1979) which is based on Peter Gent's novel, and starred in 48 Hrs. (1982) with Eddie Murphy. During the 1980s, he starred in Under Fire (1983), Down and Out in Beverly Hills (1986), Extreme Prejudice (1987) and New York Stories (1989). Nolte starred with Katharine Hepburn in her last leading film role in Grace Quigley (1985). Nolte and Murphy starred again in the sequel Another 48 Hrs.. In 1991, Nolte starred in The Prince of Tides and was nominated for the Academy Award for Best Actor. Later, he starred in Martin Scorsese's remake of Cape Fear with Robert De Niro and Jessica Lange. Nolte also starred in Lorenzo's Oil (1992), Jefferson in Paris (1995), Mulholland Falls (1996) and Afterglow (1997). He received his second Academy Award nomination the same year for Affliction. Nolte starred with Sean Penn in three films, including Terrence Malick's war epic The Thin Red Line, U Turn, and Gangster Squad.

In 1992, Nolte was named the Sexiest Man Alive by People magazine. When asked about the selection he said "Are you sure you didn't make a mistake? My personal choice is Walter Cronkite."

Nolte continued to work in the 2000s, taking smaller parts in Clean and Hotel Rwanda, both performances receiving positive reviews. He also played supporting roles in the 2006 drama Peaceful Warrior and the 2008 comedy Tropic Thunder. In 2011, Nolte played recovering alcoholic Paddy Conlon in Warrior, and was nominated for Academy Award for Best Supporting Actor. Beginning in 2011, Nolte starred with Dustin Hoffman in the HBO series Luck. At the start of production of the second season, however, HBO ended the series after the death of three horses during filming. In 2013, he was in the movie Parker which starred Jason Statham. In 2015, Nolte starred in the biopic comedy-drama A Walk in the Woods and in the revenge thriller Return to Sender.

From 2016 to 2017, Nolte starred in Graves on Epix about a volatile, hard-drinking former U.S. president who has been retired for 25 years and who has a political epiphany to right the wrongs of his past administration in very public and unpredictable ways.

For Nolte, acting is not a career but something he needs to do, he says, "a need in the sense that I can't find anything as complex and interesting to do, but I need it in a story," and "I don't want to do reality because reality never runs smooth". He likes to vanish into a role "if the story reaches up to where the great actor is, the great actor disappears, and the story becomes number one, that's as real as it gets". Nolte appeared as recurring character Kuiil in the Disney+ series The Mandalorian in 2019.

Personal life
Nolte married Clytie Lane in 2016. He was previously married to Sheila Page, Sharyn Haddad, and Rebecca Linger. Nolte and Linger have a son, Brawley (born 1986), who has had a few acting roles himself. Nolte and Lane have a daughter, Sophie (born 2007). Sophie played his granddaughter in Head Full of Honey. Nolte and Linger also had a daughter in 1983 who was stillborn. Nolte has dated Karen Eklund, Debra Winger, and Vicki Lewis.

Julia Roberts and Nolte co-starred in the film I Love Trouble in 1994. Following its release, the LA Times reported that the two did not get along well and had multiple spats on-set.

Legal troubles and substance abuse
Nolte is known for his "bad-boy reputation".

In 1965, he was arrested for selling counterfeit documents and given a 45-year prison sentence and a $75,000 fine, but the sentence was suspended. However, the felony conviction left him ineligible for military service. He had felt obligated to serve in the Vietnam War, and says that he felt incomplete as a young man for not going to Vietnam.

On September 11, 2002, Nolte was arrested on suspicion of drunk driving in Malibu, California. Tests later showed that he was under the influence of GHB. Nolte responded that he has "been taking it for four years and I've never been raped." Three days later, he checked himself into Silver Hill Hospital in Connecticut for counseling. On December 12, 2002, he pleaded no contest to charges of driving under the influence. He was given three years' probation, with orders to undergo alcohol and drug counseling with random testing required.

In 2005, The Independent reported that Nolte had struggled with substance abuse for "the majority of his adult life" and had begun abusing alcohol at an early age. After remaining sober for nearly 10 years, he resumed drinking in the late 1990s. Following his 2002 arrest, he again stopped drinking. In 2018, he told The Saturday Evening Post that he did not have a drug problem and that he had been "relatively clean outside of prescription stuff for years".

Filmography

Film

Television

Accolades

Other honors
 1992 – People: Sexiest Man Alive
 Nolte received a star on the Hollywood Walk of Fame on November 20, 2017.

Notes

References

External links

 

1940s births
Living people
Age controversies
20th-century American male actors
21st-century American male actors
American male film actors
American people of German descent
American male television actors
American male voice actors
American men's basketball players
Arizona State University alumni
Best Drama Actor Golden Globe (film) winners
Eastern Arizona College alumni
Eastern Arizona Gila Monsters men's basketball players
Film producers from Arizona
Forwards (basketball)

Male actors from Omaha, Nebraska
Pasadena City College alumni
Phoenix College alumni
Stella Adler Studio of Acting alumni